Felix Landau (May 21, 1910 – April 4, 1983) was an SS Hauptscharführer, a member of an Einsatzkommando during World War II, based first in Lwów, Poland (today Lviv, Ukraine), and later in Drohobycz. Landau was a participant in numerous mass shooting of Galician Jews. He is known for his daily diary and for temporarily sparing the life of the Jewish/Polish artist Bruno Schulz in 1942. Landau liked Schulz's art and supplied him with protection and extra food. In return, he ordered the artist to paint a set of murals for his young son's bedroom, depicting scenes from the Brothers Grimm fairy tales. Landau also was the SS officer assigned to watch over Maria Altmann, the subject of the 2015 film Woman in Gold.

Early career 

Born as the illegitimate child of Paul Stipkowich and Maria Maier, Felix Richard Landau received the surname of his Jewish stepfather after his mother had married Jakob Landau in 1911.
In 1925, Landau joined National Socialist Youth and was expelled from apprentice boarding school (run by a Catholic lay order) for active recruitment activities. In 1930 he joined Austrian Bundesheer (2nd Dragoner Squadron). In March 1931 he joined NSDAP and in May became a political leader of a local Nazi army district. In June 1933 was expelled from Bundesheer for Nazi activities. From June 1933 to April 1934 Felix Landau was a member of Sturmabteilung (SA), after that in SS. For participation in the assassination of Austrian chancellor Engelbert Dollfuss (1934) he was imprisoned. Upon his release in 1937, he renewed Nazi activities and had to flee to avoid another arrest. Landau became a naturalized German citizen, got married and worked as a police assistant in the Gestapo.

World War II and service in Einsatzkommando 
In 1940, Landau transferred to KdS/SD in Radom governed by the General Government where he met typist Gertrude, to whom he later addressed his letters.

In June 1941, Felix Landau volunteered for Einsatzkommando service. He began his diary in July 1941, interspersing sentimental letters to his fiancée with detailed records of his participation in actions related to the Holocaust. He describes "shooting exercises" and "wild actions", shooting sprees wherein he and his men would pick off random Jews who worked nearby or passed by on the street. In one such event in November 1942, Landau killed the personal dentist of a fellow officer, Karl Günther. In revenge, Günther caught up with Bruno Schulz, then under the protection of Landau, and shot him twice in the head. According to Schulz's friend Izydor Friedman, who witnessed the death, this happened at the corner of Czacki and Mickiewicz Streets. Later, Günther told Landau: "You killed my Jew - I killed yours."

At the end of 1941, he lived with Gertrude in an aristocratic villa. He divorced his first wife in 1942 and married Gertrude in 1943 (divorced in 1946). Until May 1943, Landau was in charge of organizing Jewish labor.

After World War II 
In 1946, a former worker recognized him in Linz. Landau was arrested by the Americans but escaped from Glasenbach prison camp in August 1947. Under the name of Rudolf Jaschke he started an interior decorating company in Bavaria.

In 1959, Landau was arrested and accused of participating in massacres. He was condemned to life imprisonment in 1962 at the Stuttgart Assize Court. He was released from prison in 1973. He was buried in the Hernalser Cemetery in Vienna, Austria

Quotes from the diary 
 Lwow - 5 July 1941... There were hundreds of Jews walking along the street with blood pouring down their faces, holes in their heads, their hands broken and their eyes hanging out of their sockets. They were covered in blood. Some were carrying others who had collapsed. We went to the citadel; there we saw things that few people have ever seen. At the entrance to the citadel there were soldiers standing guard. They were holding clubs as thick as a man's wrist and were lashing out and hitting anyone who crossed their path. The Jews were pouring out of the entrance. There were rows of Jews lying one on top of the other like pigs, whimpering horribly. The Jews kept streaming out of the citadel completely covered in blood. We stopped and tried to see who was in charge of the Kommando. Nobody. Someone had let the Jews go. They were just being hit out of rage and hatred...
 Drohobycz - 12 July 1941... At 6:00 in the morning I was suddenly awoken from a deep sleep. Report for an execution. Fine, so I'll just play executioner and then gravedigger, why not?... Twenty-three had to be shot, amongst them ... two women ... We had to find a suitable spot to shoot and bury them. After a few minutes we found a place. The death candidates assembled with shovels to dig their own graves. Two of them were weeping. The others certainly have incredible courage... Strange, I am completely unmoved. No pity, nothing. That's the way it is and then it's all over... Valuables, watches and money are put into a pile... The two women are lined up at one end of the grave ready to be shot first... As the women walked to the grave they were completely composed. They turned around. Six of us had to shoot them. The job was assigned thus: three at the heart, three at the head. I took the heart. The shots were fired and the brains whizzed through the air. Two in the head is too much. They almost tear it off...

See also
List of prison escapes

References

Further reading
 Love letters of a Nazi murderer in Lemberg and Drohobycz by Felix Landau (Yad Vashem), 1987 ASIN B0007C502 O
 The Holocaust: Origins, Implementation and Aftermath (Rewriting Histories) by Omer Bartov (pp. 185–203 contain excerpts from Felix Landau's diary and a biographical note)
 Masters of Death: The SS-Einsatzgruppen and the Invention of the Holocaust by Richard Rhodes (Vintage, 2003 reprint ed.) 
 The Second World War: A Complete History by Martin Gilbert
 The Third Reich: A New History by Michael Burleigh
 The Racial State: Germany 1933–1945 by Michael Burleigh (Cambridge University Press, 1991 reprint ed)

External links 
 Faces in the Textual Neighborhood: Two Poles and a Lithuanian by Adam Zachary Newton, University of Texas, Austin
 Finding Pictures
  Austrian Holocaust
 Ukraine - Jewish Art (PBS-NPR)
 Yad Vashem not displaying Bruno Schulz Holocaust art  by Amiran Barkat (Ha'aretz April 7, 2005), (International Survey of Jewish Monuments)

1910 births
1983 deaths
Einsatzgruppen personnel
Escapees from United States military detention
Fugitives
Austrian escapees
People convicted of murder by Germany
Gestapo personnel
Holocaust perpetrators in Poland
Holocaust perpetrators in Ukraine
Jewish Polish history
Jewish Ukrainian history
Nazi Party members
Prisoners and detainees of Austria
Prisoners sentenced to life imprisonment by Germany
SS non-commissioned officers
Sturmabteilung personnel
World War II prisoners of war held by the United States